Laura Hasn't Slept is a 2020 American short horror film written, directed, and co-produced by Parker Finn. The film stars Caitlin Stasey and Lew Temple. It would later serve as inspiration for Finn's feature-length horror film Smile (2022); a continuation in which Stasey briefly reprised her role.

Plot 
While telling her therapist Dr. Parsons about a recurring nightmare in which a sinister man constantly smiles at her, Laura Weaver discovers that she is still experiencing the nightmare when Dr. Parsons morphs into a grotesque creature that wants to force Laura to look at it. Refusing to look, Laura runs out of the room. She returns a few moments later, believing the monster has gone; however, it suddenly appears in front of her, causing her to go insane and screams as she rips off her own face.

Cast 
 Caitlin Stasey as Laura Weaver
 Lew Temple as Dr. Parsons

Release 
The film was screened at the SXSW Film Festival. Following the success of Smile, it was released on YouTube in November 2022.

Reception 
Nightmarish Conjurings does "not recommend the film if you're having problems sleeping". Morbidly Beautiful scored it 4.5 out of 5. IMDb scored it 6.8/10, based on 612 votes.

References

External links 
 
 
 Laura Hasn't Slept on YouTube

2020 horror films
2020 short films
American horror short films
2020s English-language films
2020s American films
Films about nightmares
Films about sleep disorders
Films released on YouTube